John Paris Jr. (born August 1, 1946) is a Canadian former professional ice hockey player, coach, and scout.

John Paris Jr. is a trailblazer in every sense.

The Windsor, NS native who stands at just 5-foot-5 played hockey on championship teams at many levels, but that alone is not what had him earn his place at the Nova Scotia Sport Hall of Fame.

Paris’ playing career ended in 1970 after playing in the MMJHL, the QJAHL, the AHL, the WHL, the EHL, and even a few NHL exhibition games. It was then he began the career that would really make a name for him.

From John being befriended by Maurice “Rocket” Richard as a junior, to being brought back from near-death in a Montreal hospital at age 25, to getting a “street lesson” in Atlanta when caught in a gang fight, and more.”

In 1962-64, he played hockey for the Windsor Royals Midgets minor hockey team and developed into such a talented player that he received invitation letters to attend the camps of several NHL teams, and in May 1963, the Paris family received a visit at home from a young Montreal Canadiens scout named Scotty Bowman (who became the winningest coach in NHL history and won the Stanley Cup nine times). Bowman had taken a 17-hour long train ride to meet Paris. Paris tried out for the Junior Canadiens and found himself on the Montreal Forum ice with the likes of future NHL players Jacques Lemaire, Carol Vadnais, Serge Savard, Andre Lacroix and Christian Bordeleau, along with NHLers like Henri Richard, Jean Beliveau, and a long list of other famous players.

At 17 years old, silently suffering from an unknown health condition, and weighing only 135 pounds, Paris didn’t make the team. Instead, he played the following season in the Montreal Metropolitan Junior Hockey League with the Maisonneuve Braves, and with the Junior A Quebec Aces in 1966, with Guy Lafleur and Gilles Gilbert. His skating and scoring prowess there earned him the nickname “Chocolate Rocket.” He climbed hockey’s ladder and made it to the minor professional leagues in 1967-68 when he player for the Knoxville Knights in the Eastern Hockey League (EHL). Paris' health had deteriorated so much that he was now on the verge of death. He had to be rushed to hospital after playing only nine games for the Knights.

While his playing career was ultimately cut short by his battles with Hodgkin's lymphoma and ulcerative colitis, Paris went on to an amazing coaching career.

During the 1970-71 season, Paris began coaching minor hockey in Sorel, in Midget and Junior with the Black Hawks (renamed Les Éperviers), and consistently moved up in the ranks.

In the 1986-1987 season, Paris lead his team, the Riverains du Richelieu, to win the Air Canada Cup, the national midget 'AAA' hockey championship, and was named coach of the year. He was the first Black coach in Midget AAA Major.

In 1987, he became the first Black scout in the NHL, for the St. Louis Blues of the NHL, and became the first Black Coach and first Black General Manager in the Quebec Major Junior Hockey League (QMJHL), initially with the Trois-Rivières Draveurs, followed by the Granby Bisons.

In the 1993-94 season, Paris was hired by the Atlanta Knights of the International Hockey League (IHL), the farm team of NHL's Tampa Bay Lightning. His move to Atlanta made him the first Black coach in professional hockey, and proved to be a good one as he led the Knights to win the Turner Cup, the IHL’s championship title.

In 1996, Paris was named Head Coach and General Manager of the new Macon Whoopees, a new team from the Central Hockey League (CHL) he helped build from the ground up. He became the first General Manager in professional hockey.

From 2000 to 2003, Paris was the Director of the hockey program at IMG Academy and the Assistant Director of the United States Junior Development Program (USJDP), where he coached for 19 years.

Also, a certified sports psychologist, Paris has a special ability to motivate his players as well as a vast hockey knowledge that covers all aspects of the game. Now living in Fort Worth, Texas with his wife and young daughter, John is actively involved in hockey as a consultant for top-level professional players.

In February 2023, for Paris’ many firsts and contributions to the sport, Hockey Nova Scotia launched a petition to have Paris considered by the Hockey Hall of Fame Selection Committee, to be inducted into the Hockey Hall of Fame as a Builder. Presented on the Web and in Social Media under the slogan “Paris to Toronto”, the initiative rose important support and attention from the media and the population.

References

External links 
 NHL.com - Paris helped put Atlanta hockey on the map
 Image of John Paris Jr.
 MJAHL Team roster
 Restigouche Tigers profile
 Atlanta Knights profile
 Official website

1946 births
Black Canadian ice hockey players
Black Nova Scotians
Canadian ice hockey coaches
Eastern Hockey League players
Granby Bisons coaches
Ice hockey people from Nova Scotia
Living people
People from Windsor, Nova Scotia
Saint-Jean Lynx coaches